Gilf Kebir (var. Gilf al-Kebir, Jilf al Kabir, Gilf Kebir Plateau)  is a plateau in the New Valley Governorate of the remote southwest corner of Egypt, and southeast Libya. Its name translates as "the Great Barrier". This  sandstone plateau, roughly the size of Puerto Rico, rises  from the Libyan Desert floor. It is the true heart of the Gilf Kebir National Park.

The name Gilf Kebir was given to the plateau by Prince Kamal el Dine Hussein in 1925, as it had no local name. It is known for its rugged beauty, remoteness, geological interest, and the dramatic cliff paintings-pictographs and rock carvings-petroglyphs which depict an earlier era of abundant animal life and human habitation.

Geography and climate
The Uweinat mountain range at the very south of the plateau extends from Egypt into Libya and Sudan.

Wadis
The plateau is crisscrossed by Wadis (dry, seasonal riverbeds).  These include:
 Wadi Hamra 
 Wadi Akhdar 
 Wadi Bakht 
 Wadi Dayiq 
 Wadi Firaq 
 Wadi Gazayir 
 Wadi Maftuh 
 Wadi Mashi 
 Wadi Sura 
 Wadi Wassa 
 Wadi Abd el-Malik

Climate
Gilf Kebir Plateau lies in the heart of the eastern part of the vast Sahara Desert, and, thus, gets some of the most extreme climates on Earth. This is the driest place on the planet, not only because the area is totally rainless (the annual average rainfall amount hardly reaches 0.1 mm) but also because the geological aridity index/dryness ratio is over 200, which means that the solar energy received at the ground evaporates 200 times the amount of precipitation received. Rainfall may fall every twenty years in Gilf Kebir.

History

Petroglyphs

The Gilf Kebir is known for its prehistoric Neolithic petroglyphs
 Rock engravings in the upper part of wadi Hamra.
 Magharet el Kantara in the southern Gilf Kebir contains only one known rock art site, a cave discovered by Shaw & party in 1936.
 Wadi Sura in the southwestern Gilf Kebir: the "Cave of Swimmers", discovered by the Hungarian Count László Almásy (The English Patient), plus many other paintings nearby.
 In January 2003, Zerzura Expeditions and Jacopo Foggini independently discovered a major new rock art site in the Western Gilf Kebir (Foggini-Mestekawi Cave).
 The North-western half of the Gilf Kebir aside from Wadi Sura has only a few scattered engravings, of an apparently very ancient age.
 Karkur Talh and Karkur Murr: major eastern valleys of the Uweinat contain one of the richest concentrations of rock art in the whole Sahara.
 Western Uweinat: Shelters under the huge granite boulders in the western Uweinat contain numerous paintings, including the famous sites of Ain Doua.
 Jebel Arkenu, Jebel Kissu & Yerguehda Hill, the lesser granite massifs around Uweinat have many smaller sites.

Saharan rock art has been found to resemble the art of Nile valleys. The Saharan area was wetter until mid-Holocene or about 4000 BC, when the monsoon retreated southwards, forcing humans to migrate. Some retreated eastward to the Nile valley, taking with them their beliefs and influencing Egyptian art.

20th century exploration

The hills of the Gilf Kebir were first seen from a distance by European explorers in 1910 - with W. J. Harding-King in 1910 and 1911, and Ball and Lieutenant Moore in 1918.  The high southern part of the plateau was sighted for the first time by Prince Kamal el Dine Hussein in 1925, and on another expedition, in the following year, he fixed the eastern escarpment of the plateau and first realised the true size of the plateau.  In 1930 an expedition headed by Ralph Alger Bagnold followed the same route.  In the winter of 1930-1, P. A. Clayton surveyed some of the areas.

The western side of the Gilf Kebir was explored in 1932 by the Clayton-Almásy Expedition, headed by Sir Robert East Clayton and Count László E. Almásy, and accompanied by Patrick A. Clayton, Squadron Leader H. W. G. J. Penderel, three Arabian car drivers and a cook. The expedition explored the area by Gypsy Moth plane, by car, and on foot.

1933 Patrick Clayton and Ladislaus Almasy discovered the Aqaba-Pass, the only way up Gilf Kebir from the southern plains i.e. from wadi Sura.

WWII archeology
The plateau was the site for various British logistical operations during the Second World War, and due to the extremely dry conditions and lack of population, remains of this occupation are often found intact.  A large airbase, including huge navigation arrows laid out in army petrol cans, can still be seen at the Eight Bells spot in the southeast of Gilf Kebir.

It was also the site of the 2007 discovery of a bag that had been lost in the Second World War by a dispatch rider (Alec Ross) of the Long Range Desert Group, part of the British Army. This contained the rider's personal letters and photographs and had been well preserved.

Literary setting
The Gilf Kebir is the setting for part of Michael Ondaatje's novel The English Patient.
It also plays an important role in Paul Sussman's The Hidden Oasis.

See also
Libyan Desert
Libyan desert glass
Kebira Crater
Cave of Swimmers

References

External links
Legends haunt remote nomad's land, Matthew Davis, BBC. 25 September 2008.
'WWII Army Bag is found in Desert'
Libyan Rock Art Documentation Project
google map
Gilf Kebir - Cave of Swimmers

Plateaus of Egypt
Mountain ranges of Egypt
Sahara
Saharan rock art
Prehistoric art
New Valley Governorate